Mattias Samuelsson (born March 14, 2000) is an American professional ice hockey defenseman currently playing for the  Buffalo Sabres of the National Hockey League (NHL). He played collegiately at Western Michigan.

Playing career

Junior
Samuelsson played three seasons in the USA Hockey National Team Development Program. He was part of the team that won the silver medal at the 2019 World Junior Ice Hockey Championships. He was captain of the team at the 2020 World Junior Ice Hockey Championships.

Samuelsson was drafted by the Sarnia Sting in the fourth round of the 2016 Ontario Hockey League Draft, but chose not to play there.

College
After originally committing to the University of Michigan, Samuelsson de-committed and went to Western Michigan instead. He played two seasons at Western Michigan, where he scored seven goals and 19 assists. He was an alternate captain for the team in his sophomore year, despite being the youngest player on the team.

Professional
Samuelsson was drafted in the second round, 32nd overall, by the Buffalo Sabres in the 2018 NHL Entry Draft. He signed a three-year contract with the Sabres on March 25, 2020. He made his NHL debut with the Sabres on April 18, 2021, in a game against the Pittsburgh Penguins. Samuelsson scored his first career goal on November 30, 2022, against the Detroit Red Wings.

While playing on the Buffalo Sabres top pairing with Rasmus Dahlin Samuelsson has established himself as a defensive defenseman in the NHL and was rewarded by the Sabres with a seven-year $30 million contract on October 12, 2022.

Personal
Samuelsson's Swedish-born father, Kjell, played 14 seasons as an NHL defenseman for the Pittsburgh Penguins, Philadelphia Flyers, New York Rangers and Tampa Bay Lightning. His mother Vicki is a Pennsylvania native.
Mattias grew up modeling his game after that of longtime NHL defensemen Mattias Ekholm, Victor Hedman, and Christopher Tanev.

Career statistics

Regular season and playoffs

International

Awards and honors

References

External links

2000 births
American men's ice hockey defensemen
American people of Swedish descent
Buffalo Sabres draft picks
Buffalo Sabres players
Ice hockey players from New Jersey
Living people
People from Voorhees Township, New Jersey
Sportspeople from Camden County, New Jersey
Rochester Americans players
USA Hockey National Team Development Program players
Western Michigan Broncos men's ice hockey players
Youth Olympic gold medalists for the United States
Ice hockey players at the 2016 Winter Youth Olympics